North Beach Road is a distributor road in the northern suburbs of Perth, Western Australia, running from Gwelup to North Beach. It is mostly a two-lane divided carriageway. The central section of the road, from Reid Highway to Erindale Road, is part of State Route 77. The route continues along Erindale Road, while North Beach Road heads south to Karrinyup Road.

While the road today is minor, discontinuous and choked by roundabouts and other traffic-calming devices, it was previously one of the first major roads in the area, originally built as a plank road serving tourists and holidaymakers staying in North Beach over the summer. It extended to Wanneroo Road along what is now Karrinyup Road and North Beach Drive, but has since been assimilated into several other major road alignments, including Erindale Road and Reid Highway.

In 2000, the road was effectively bypassed by the extension of Reid Highway to Marmion Avenue, built only  to the north.

Until the 1960s, it was known as Balcatta Beach Road, even though the suburb was always known as North Beach.

Major intersections

  West Coast Drive (Tourist Drive 204), 
  Marmion Avenue (State Route 71) north & south / Reid Highway (State Route 3) east, North Beach, Carine and Karrinyup – north to  / south to  / east to 
  Reid Highway (State Route 3), Karrinyup – west to  / east to 
 Milverton Avenue, Karrinyup
 Duffy Road South northbound / Balcatta Road east, Carine, Karrinyup and Gwelup
  Erindale Road (State Route 77), Gwelup – to 
  Karrinyup Road (State Route 3), Gwelup and  – west to  / east to

See also

References

Roads in Perth, Western Australia
Articles containing video clips
City of Stirling